I Hope You're Feeling Better Now is an EP by Los Angeles indie band Irving.

Track listing
"The Curious Thing About Leather" 
"The Guns From Here"
"White Hot"
"I Can't Fall in Love" 
"Give Me Your Heart Is All I Need"

2003 EPs
Irving (band) albums